"And yet it moves" or "Although it does move" ( or  ) is a phrase attributed to the Italian mathematician, physicist and philosopher Galileo Galilei (1564–1642) in 1633 after being forced to recant his claims that the Earth moves around the Sun, rather than the converse. In this context, the implication of the phrase is: despite his recantation, the Church's proclamations to the contrary, or any other conviction or doctrine of men, the Earth does, in fact, move (around the Sun, and not vice versa).

History
According to Stephen Hawking, some historians believe this episode might have happened upon Galileo's transfer from house arrest under the watch of Archbishop Ascanio Piccolomini to "another home, in the hills above Florence". This other home was also his own, the Villa Il Gioiello, in Arcetri.

The earliest biography of Galileo, written by his disciple Vincenzo Viviani in 1655–1656, does not mention this phrase, and records of his trial do not cite it. Some authors say it would have been imprudent for Galileo to have said such a thing before the Inquisition.

The event was first reported in English print in 1757 by Giuseppe Baretti in his book The Italian Library: 
The book became widely published in Querelles Littéraires in 1761.

In 1911, the words "E pur si muove" were found on a painting which had just been acquired by an art collector, Jules van Belle, of Roeselare, Belgium. This painting is dated 1643 or 1645 (the last digit is partially obscured), within a year or two of Galileo's death. The signature is unclear but van Belle attributed it to the seventeenth century Spanish painter Bartolomé Esteban Murillo. The painting would seem to show that some variant of the "Eppur si muove" anecdote was in circulation immediately after his death, when many who had known him were still alive to attest to it, and that it had been circulating for over a century before it was published. However, this painting, whose whereabouts is currently unknown, was discovered to be nearly identical to one painted in 1837 by Eugene van Maldeghem, and, basing their opinions on the style, many art experts doubt that the van Belle painting was painted by Murillo, or even that it was painted before the nineteenth century.

References

Italian words and phrases
Galileo Galilei
Copernican Revolution
Dissent
Urban legends
Galileo affair
Politics of science
Astronomical controversies
Quotations from science
17th-century neologisms